Rushland is a defunct station on the Reading Company's New Hope Branch, originally known as Rush Valley. The station is currently on the line used by the New Hope Railroad. The station was built in 1891 and closed in 1952. The station still stands, though as of 2018 is vacant.

References

Former Reading Company stations
Railway stations in the United States opened in 1891
Former railway stations in Bucks County, Pennsylvania
Railway stations closed in 1952